= Villa de Balcozna =

Coordinates: 27°53′S 65°43′W

- Municipality and village
- Interactive map of Villa de Balcozna
- Country: Argentina
- Province: Catamarca Province
- Time zone: UTC−3 (ART)

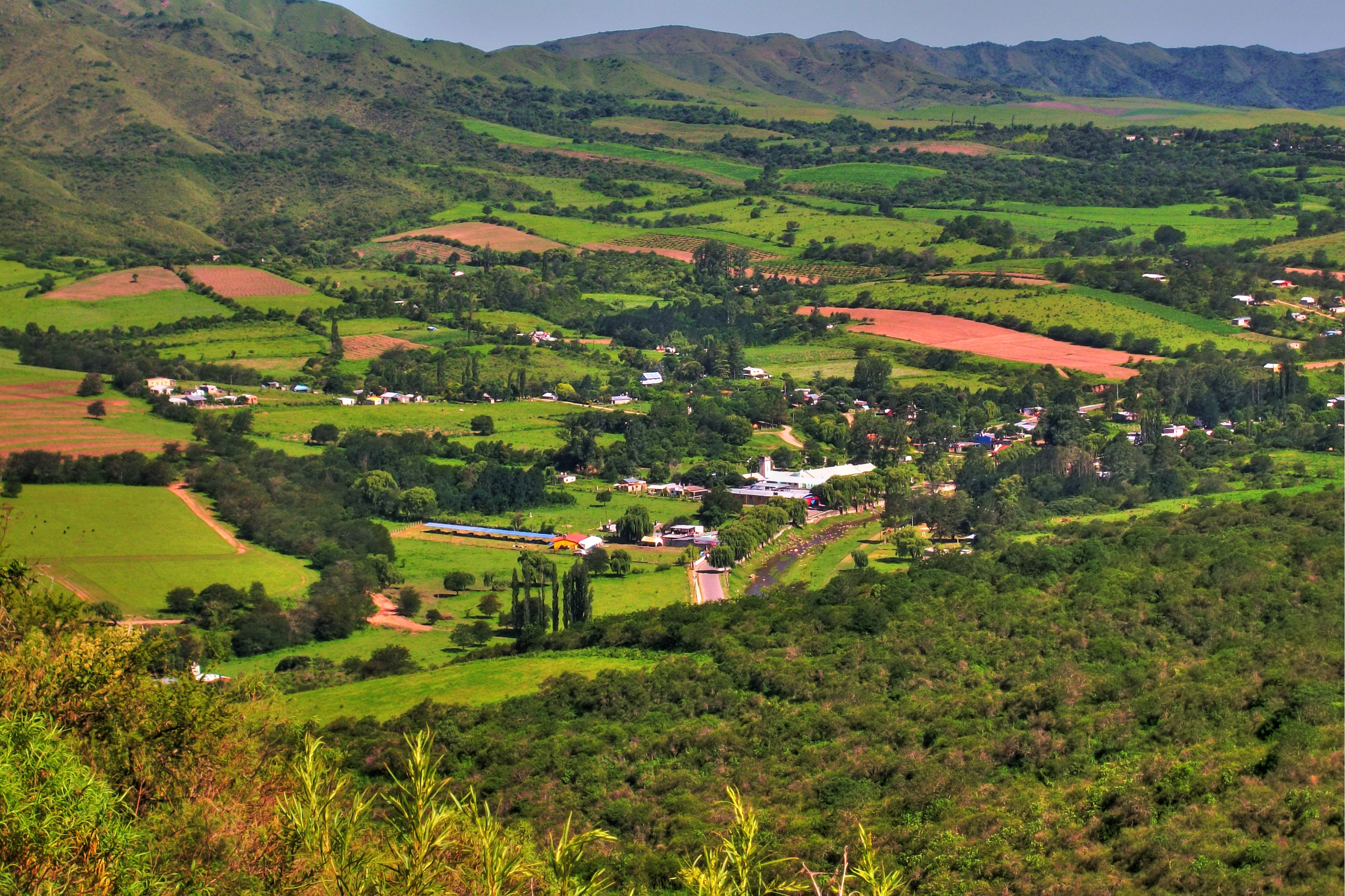
Balcozna village

Villa de Balcozna is a village and municipality in Catamarca Province in northwestern Argentina.
